Vyazovka is a rural locality (a village) in Mstyora Urban Settlement, Vyaznikovsky District, Vladimir Oblast, Russia. The population was 62 as of 2010.

Geography 
Vyazovka is located 21 km west of Vyazniki (the district's administrative centre) by road. Mstyora is the nearest rural locality.

References 

Rural localities in Vyaznikovsky District